Richard Glenmor Beynon, stage name Bynon (stylized BYNON), is a British-Canadian music producer and DJ.

Early life

The clarinet prodigy-turned-DJ/producer/songwriter comes from a family of musicians hailing from South Wales (UK). He grew up in Vancouver, British Columbia. He studied at Langley Fine Arts School, Juilliard School, and McGill University.

He played guitar, bass, keyboards, piano, and drums before becoming a clarinet player. He performed with the Surrey Youth Orchestra and the Vancouver Summer Pops Youth Orchestra and won gold at the Kiwanis International Fraser Valley Music Festival.

Collaborating with his father, Bynon arranged and produced three successful albums featuring many genres of music including classical, jazz, and pop.

Career
A seasoned performer, Bynon toured around North America, with multiple dates in Europe and Asia. Highlights include Paradiso Festival at the Gorge in Seattle, a four-year residency in the Las Vegas circuit featuring Legendary Pool Party REHAB and SLS, and most recently in 2018 at îleSoniq Festival, in his adopted hometown of Montreal.
 
With his freshman releases alongside Dannic, Project 46 & Feenixpawl, his name popped up monthly on Beatport top 10 charts, (Golden Hearts, Eyes, Home) on Revealed, Ultra Records and Atlantic throughout 2014.
 
At the end of 2015 Bynon's massive rework Ganja Man featuring Sean Paul went viral on YouTube, accumulating over 23 million views.

In early 2016, Bynon decided to focus primarily on songwriting and production, working with Sean Paul, Kaskade, Ilsey, Taryn Manning, Mako, Jane XØ and many more. He has been involved with major projects at Columbia, Atlantic, Sony and Warner Music. Corey Hart commissioned him to co-write and produce Jonathan Roy's sophomore album Mr. Optimist Blues, which included the Certified Gold Record Smash "Daniella Denmark".

He has co-written numerous #1 iTunes albums and singles, and issued several solo releases and remixes in 2018.

Personal life
Bynon resides in both Montreal and Los Angeles.

Discography

Singles and remixes

Songwriting and production credits

References

British DJs
British record producers
British emigrants to Canada
Canadian DJs
Canadian record producers
Living people
McGill University alumni
Musicians from Vancouver
Electronic dance music DJs
Year of birth missing (living people)